Claremont High School Historic District is a national historic district located at Hickory, Catawba County, North Carolina. The district encompasses 172 contributing buildings and 3 contributing structures in a predominantly residential section of Hickory. Most of the dwellings date from the late 19th through mid-20th century and include notable examples of Queen Anne, Colonial Revival, Tudor Revival, and Bungalow / American Craftsman style architecture. The Claremont High School was completed in 1925, and is a three-story, "H"-shaped, Neoclassical style school. The school was rehabilitated in 1986 as an arts and science center. Other notable buildings include Maple Grove (c. 1875), Shuler-Harper House (1887), Harvey E. McComb House (1889), (former) Corinth Reformed Church Parsonage (1895), Shuford L. Whitener House (1897, c. 1910), Judge W. B. Councill House (1902), George W. Hall House (c. 1906), Carolina Park, Josephine Lyerly House (c. 1912), John L. Riddle House (1918), Marshall R. Wagner House (1938), David M. McComb Jr. House (1939), Arthur H. Burgess House (1940), and R. L. Noblin House (1950).

It was added to the National Register of Historic Places in 1986, with a boundary increase in 2009.

SALT Block 
The block in which high school sits is home to the SALT Block. The attractions on site include the Catawba Science Center, Hickory Choral Society, Hickory Museum of Art, United Arts Council, and the Western Piedmont Symphony.

References

External links

Historic American Buildings Survey in North Carolina
Historic districts on the National Register of Historic Places in North Carolina
Neoclassical architecture in North Carolina
Queen Anne architecture in North Carolina
Colonial Revival architecture in North Carolina
Tudor Revival architecture in North Carolina
Buildings and structures in Catawba County, North Carolina
National Register of Historic Places in Catawba County, North Carolina